This is a list of Maldivian films scheduled to release during the year 2018.

Releases

Theatre Releases

Television

References

External links

Maldivian
2018